In the 2017–18 season, Al Sadd SC competed in the Qatar Stars League for the 45th season, as well as the Emir of Qatar Cup the Qatar Crown Prince Cup the Sheikh Jassim Cup and the Champions League.

Pre-season and friendlies

Competitions

Overview

{| class="wikitable" style="text-align: center"
|-
!rowspan=2|Competition
!colspan=8|Record
!rowspan=2|Started round
!rowspan=2|Final position / round
!rowspan=2|First match	
!rowspan=2|Last match
|-
!
!
!
!
!
!
!
!
|-
| Qatar Stars League

| Matchday 1
| style="background:silver;"| Runners–up
| 16 September 2017
| 7 April 2018
|-
| Emir of Qatar Cup

| Quarter-final 
| Semi-final
| 3 May 2018
| 11 May 2018
|-
| Qatar Crown Prince Cup

| Semi-finals 
| style="background:silver;"| Runners–up
| 22 April 2018
| 27 April 2018
|-
| Sheikh Jassim Cup

| Final 
| style="background:gold;"| winners
| colspan=2| 9 September 2017
|-
| Champions League

| Group Stage 
| Quarter-final
| 13 February 2018
| 14 May 2018
|-
! Total

Qatar Stars League

League table

Results summary

Results by round

Matches

Emir of Qatar Cup

Crown Prince Cup

Sheikh Jassim Cup

AFC Champions League

Group stage

Group C

Knockout stage

Round of 16

Squad information

Playing statistics

|-

|-
! colspan=16 style=background:#dcdcdc; text-align:center| Players transferred out during the season

Goalscorers
Includes all competitive matches. The list is sorted alphabetically by surname when total goals are equal.

Players

Players with Multiple Nationalities
   Ibrahim Majid
   Pedro Miguel
   Yasser Abubakar
   Ali Asad
   Ahmed Sayyar
   Hussain Bahzad
   Ali Ferydoon
   Boualem Khoukhi

Transfers

In

Out

References

Al Sadd SC seasons
Qatari football clubs 2017–18 season